Lily & Madeleine are an American folk pop duo from Indianapolis, Indiana, consisting of the sisters Lily and Madeleine Jurkiewicz. They have released four full-length studio albums, Lily & Madeleine (2013) and Fumes (2014) on Asthmatic Kitty, Keep It Together (2016) and Canterbury Girls (2019) on New West Records.

Biography
Lily & Madeleine began singing together as high school students, uploading home videos of cover songs to YouTube. On the strength of those videos, the Bloomington, Indiana, producer Paul Mahern invited them into his studio to record their first EP, The Weight of the Globe, when their class schedule permitted.

With the help of Kenny Childers (Gentleman Caller), they co-wrote their first original songs for that EP, and a video of Lily & Madeleine singing in Mahern's studio reached the front page of the news aggregator Reddit. The Weight of the Globe was picked for a 2013 release by Sufjan Stevens's Asthmatic Kitty Records, and John Mellencamp asked the sisters to contribute guest vocals to the soundtrack of his musical, Ghost Brothers of Darkland County.

In February 2013, they sold out their first live shows in Indianapolis. That October, they made their national TV debut on CBS This Morning in anticipation of their first LP, released at the end of the month. In reviewing Lily & Madeleine, The New York Times argued that "the thing that flags them as extraordinary is their sibling vocal blend, deep and seamless and relaxed".

In addition to promotional videos such as "Back to the River", directed by Allister Ann in support of The Weight of the Globe, and "Come to Me" from Lily & Madeleine, directed by Tyler Jones, Lily & Madeleine continue to release live videos of their acoustic performances in the studio, directed by graduates of Bishop Chatard High School in Indianapolis graduates, Nicole Lehrman and Stuart Hotwagoner.

In February 2019, they released their fourth LP, Canterbury Girls, to favorable reviews. Pop Magazine awarded the album a rating of 5 out of 5 stars, praising it as "a beautifully balanced album", further saying that "Lily & Madeleine ask tough questions – about the world, about modern love, about themselves – but their mere delivery is graceful, vulnerable, and ultimately empowering". The album received a rating of 4 out of 5 stars from AllMusic, calling it a "solid set of songs", adding that producers "Fitchuck and Tashian prove a tasteful fit for the duo".

On Christmas Day 2019, New West Records released a cover version of The Beatles' song "Across the Universe" performed by Lily & Madeleine with the Accidentals.

Discography

Albums
 Lily & Madeleine (Asthmatic Kitty, 2013)
 Fumes (Asthmatic Kitty, 2014)
 Keep It Together (New West Records, 2016)
 Canterbury Girls (New West Records, 2019)

EPs
 The Weight of the Globe (Asthmatic Kitty, 2013)
 Daytrotter Session, 31 May 2013 – Daytrotter Studio, Rock Island, IL (Daytrotter, 2013)

Appearances
 "Things I'll Later Lose" in Pretty Little Liars (2012)
 "Truth" by John Mellencamp on Ghost Brothers of Darkland County (Hear Music, 2013)
 "Lost It to Trying" by Son Lux on Lanterns (Joyful Noise, 2013)
 "Danny Boy" by Time for Three on Time for Three (Universal Music Group, 2014)
 A Prairie Home Companion on 2 May 2015
 "What Kind of Friend" on Treasure of the Broken Land: The Songs of Mark Heard, 2017
 "Can't Help the Way I Feel" in Promising Young Woman (2020)
 "The Hour" by Son Lux on Tomorrows III (City Slang, 2021)

References

External links
 
 

American folk musical groups
American musical duos
Musical groups from Indianapolis
Asthmatic Kitty artists
Sibling musical duos
New West Records artists
2012 establishments in Indiana
Musical groups established in 2012
Folk music duos
Female musical duos